Captain Richard Been Stannard,  (21 August 1902 – 22 July 1977) was a British sailor, officer in the Royal Naval Reserve (RNR), and a recipient of the Victoria Cross (VC), the highest award for gallantry in the face of the enemy that can be awarded to British and Commonwealth forces. Stannard was awarded the first VC to the RNR in the Second World War.

Early life
In February 1912, when Stannard was ten, his father was lost at sea along with the steamer Mount Oswald, of which he was captain. For the next five years Stannard studied at the Royal Naval Merchant School in Wokingham, Berkshire. He then entered the Merchant Service aged 15.

Victoria Cross
Stannard was 37 years old, and a lieutenant in the Royal Naval Reserve during the Second World War when the following deed took place for which he was awarded the Victoria Cross (VC).

From 28 April to 2 May 1940 at Namsos, Norway, HMT Arab survived 31 bombing attacks in five days. On one occasion during this period Lieutenant Stannard and two of his crew tackled for two hours a fire on the jetty caused by a bomb igniting ammunition. Part of the jetty was saved, which proved invaluable at the subsequent evacuation. Later feats included the destruction of an enemy bomber whose pilot, thinking that he had HMT Arab at his mercy, ordered that she be steered into captivity.

In the London Gazette of 5 December 1944, Stannard was mentioned in despatches for distinguished service while commanding HMS Peacock in the protection of convoys to North Russia in the face of attacks by U-boats.

Later life
Before and after the war Stannard settled in Essex before later emigrating to Australia. He died in Sydney on 22 July 1977. The local council erected a blue plaque to him on his former house in The Avenue, Loughton, Essex. In his birth town of Blyth, Northumberland a multi-use building has been given the name Richard Stannard House (1999).

References

External links

Trawlers lost in the Namsen Fjord

1902 births
1977 deaths
British Merchant Navy officers
British World War II recipients of the Victoria Cross
Companions of the Distinguished Service Order
English emigrants to Australia
People from Blyth, Northumberland
People from Loughton
Recipients of the War Cross with Sword (Norway)
Royal Naval Reserve personnel
Royal Navy officers of World War II
Royal Navy recipients of the Victoria Cross